Single adult may refer to:

Single person
Bachelor
Single adult (LDS Church)